Rialto is a neighbourhood in Venice, Italy.

Rialto may also refer to:

Places

Ireland
 Rialto, Dublin, a neighbourhood

Italy
 Rialto, Liguria, a town in Liguria, Italy

United States
 Rialto, California, a city in San Bernardino County, California
 Rialto, Manhattan, a 19th-century theatrical district in New York City
 Rialto Beach, a beach on the Pacific Coast of Washington state

Buildings, venues and structures
 Rialto (Portland, Oregon), a café in Portland, Oregon
 Rialto Bridge, a bridge spanning the Grand Canal in Venice, Italy
 Rialto Cinema, Dunedin, a cinema in Dunedin, New Zealand
 Rialto Theater (disambiguation), various theaters
 Rialto Towers, a skyscraper in Melbourne, Australia

Businesses
 Rialto Channel, a New Zealand television channel
 Rialto Film, a German motion-picture production company
 Event Cinemas (Rialto Cinemas), a New Zealand cinema chain

Literature
 The Rialto (poetry magazine), a poetry magazine in the United Kingdom
 The Rialto Report, a podcast and article series documenting the Golden Age of Porn (1969–1984)

Other uses
 Rialto (band), an English rock band
 Rialto (film), a 2019 film by Peter Mackie Burns
 Reliant Rialto, a three-wheeled car produced by the Reliant Motor Company
 "At the Rialto", a short story by American writer Connie Willis published in 1989